Bari McKenzie (born 16 August 1986) is a Scottish professional ice hockey forward currently playing for the Fife Flyers in the Elite Ice Hockey League.

links

References

1986 births
Living people
Basingstoke Bison players
Belfast Giants players
Cardiff Devils players
Chelmsford Chieftains players
Coventry Blaze players
Edinburgh Capitals players
Milton Keynes Lightning players
Milton Keynes Thunder players
Scottish ice hockey forwards
Solway Sharks players
Braehead Clan players
Dundee Stars players
Fife Flyers players
Sportspeople from Dumfries